Keshav Pandit is an Indian crime drama series that premiered on May 15, 2010 on Zee TV. The series is revolves around the life of a fictional hero Keshav Pandit - originally created by Ved Prakash Sharma - and is produced by Ekta Kapoor and Shobha Kapoor under their banner Balaji Telefilms.

Plot
The series revolves around Madhav Shastri who is punished at the age of 14 for a crime which he hasn't committed. At the age of 24, he emerges as Keshav Pandit who plans to help the innocent trapped in the vicious circle of the law as he doesn't want anyone else to face the hardships he has gone through.

Cast
 Sarwar Ahuja as Keshav Pandit/Madhav Shastri
 Rajat Tokas as young Madhav Shastri
 Aman Verma
 Gungun Uprari 
 Neetha Shetty
 Panchi Bora as Sonu Juneja
 Aanchal Munjal
 Via Roy Choudhury as Saira Khan
 Zubin Dutt as Mangal

References

External links
 

Category

Balaji Telefilms television series
Zee TV original programming
2010 Indian television series debuts
Indian teen drama television series